Adi ibn Hatim al-Tai was a leader of the Arab tribe of Tayy, and one of the companions of Muhammad. He was the son of the poet Hatim al-Tai who was widely known for his chivalry, masculinity, and generosity among Arabs. Adi remained antagonistic to Islam for about twenty years until he converted to Islam  in 630 (9th year of Hijri).

Biography 
Adiyy inherited the domain of his father and was confirmed in the position by the Tayy people. A great part of his strength lay in the fact that a quarter of any amount they gained as booty from raiding expeditions had to be given to him.

Before Islam 
Before being preached personally by prophet Muhammad during an encounter with the latter, according to his own words, Adi was practitioner of Rakusiyya, which spelled Rekusi according to Adil Salahi. Rakusiyya was a particular syncretic sect which adhered both the teaching of Christianity of Jesus and the Judaism follower of Zechariah. However, according to linguists and lexicon expert in Egypt who observed the Hadith conversation between Adi and Muhammad, Rakusiyyah were a syncretic mixture between christian and Sabians religion.

Professor Clément Huart has theorized this sect was linked to Manichaeism due to the syncretic nature of the sect. According to Dr. Khalid Basalamah, the sect was regarded as heretic by official Eastern Orthodox Church of Byzantine, so Adi has to practice it in secrecy, out of fear from the persecution from his Byzantine overlord.

After Islam 
After being convinced about the error of his faith according to Islam, Adi converted to Islam.

Ibn Hatim joined the Islamic army at the time of caliph Abu Bakr. He fought wars of revolt against the apostates and also was a commander of the Islamic army sent to invade Iraq under the command of Khalid ibn al-Walid.

Adi were also among Muslim soldiers that participated in Khalid legendary desert crossing from Iraq to Levant. As Khalid reached Levant, he then sent by Khalid to Medina to brought a portion of fifth of the spoils of war for caliph Abu Bakar.

He also fought on the side of Ali ibn Abi Talib, at the Battle of Camel and Battle of Siffin.

Legacy 
Bukhari, Muslim, Ahmad ibn Hanbal, and others have attributed hadiths to him.

References

Further reading
https://referenceworks.brillonline.com/entries/encyclopaedia-of-islam-2/adi-b-hatim-SIM_0307?s.num=0&s.f.s2_parent=s.f.book.encyclopaedia-of-islam-2&s.q=Adi+ibn+Hatim
A history of Arabic literature by Professor Clement Huart

Companions of the Prophet
Converts to Islam from Christianity
Year of birth unknown
Arab people of the Arab–Byzantine wars
Tayy
People of the Ridda Wars